The Howeitat or Huwaitat ( al-Ḥuwayṭāt, Northwest Arabian dialect: ál-Ḥwēṭāt) are a large Judhami tribe, that inhabits areas of present-day southern Jordan, the Sinai Peninsula and Sharqia governate in Egypt, the Negev, and northwestern Saudi Arabia. The Howeitat have several branches, notably the Ibn Jazi, the Abu Tayi, the Anjaddat, and the Sulaymanniyin, in addition to a number of associated tribes.

History

Formation 
Howeitat nomads were recorded as the only tribesmen living in the southern, inland area of the al-Karak-Shawbak sanjak (district) of the Ottoman Empire in the 16th century. According to the Ottoman historian Qutb al-Din al-Nahrawali (d. 1582), the tribe was a branch of the Banu Uqba, the dominant tribe of the al-Karak-Shawbak region during Mamluk rule (1260–1516) and whose chieftains were officially recognized by the Mamluk authorities. The Howeitat are unusual in claiming descent from a single ancestor, an Egyptian named Huwayt. However, according to Kamal Salibi, their presence in the area may date from the 18th century, when tribes of the northern Arabian desert were being pushed northwards by expansion of the Wahhabite-associated bedouin of central Arabia; by the late 18th century the Howeitat were already laying claim to areas around Aqaba and northwards; they also laid claim to land in Egypt. They developed into a partly settled tribe, combining farming in the fertile areas of Jabal Shara with pastoralism, but early in the 20th century were rendered more or less nomadic by the activities of two rival shaikhs, Abtan ibn Jazi and Auda abu Tayi, who concentrated on raiding, collection of tribute and camel-herding.

Role during the Arab Revolt

The abu Tayi subclan of the tribe were supporters of the Hashemite cause during the Arab Revolt, in which they formed an important part of Faisal's forces; Auda abu Tayi was able to muster a force of Bedouin tribesmen willing to march on Aqaba under the banner of Prince Feisal bin Hussein. The ibn Jazi subclan of the tribe remained loyal to the Ottoman Empire: their leader Hamad ibn Jazi was decorated by the empire in early 1917. In later years the Howeitat returned to farming; they were also prominent in the Arab Legion, the ibn Jazi section becoming the most powerful component in the federation. The Howeitat still have possession of large areas of land around Wadi Rum and stretching into Saudi Arabia;  they have historically been a significant source of manpower for the Saudi Arabian National Guard and the Royal Jordanian Land Force.

Present-day status and Saudi displacement 
Nowadays, the Howeitat tribe has largely given up its nomadic lifestyle, and settled into villages. On 13 April 2020 a Howeitat man named Abdul Rahim al-Huwaiti posted videos online announcing that Saudi security forces were trying to evict him and other members of the tribe from their historic homeland to make way for the development of Neom. Alya Abutayah Alhwaiti, a Saudi human rights activist also of the Howeitat tribe, circulated the videos. In the videos Abdul Rahim al-Huwaiti said he would defy the eviction orders though he expected Saudi authorities would plant weapons in his house to incriminate him.

He was later killed by Saudi security forces, who claimed he had opened fire on them. This version of events was disputed by Alya Abutayah Alhwaiti who said that he did not own firearms. His funeral was held near the village of al-Khoraibah and was well attended despite the presence of Saudi security forces.

Eight cousins of Abdul Rahim al-Huwaiti have been arrested for protesting against the eviction order but Alya Abutayah Alhwaiti said that she and human rights activists in the west hoped to challenge the arrests. Alhwaiti says that the Howeitat are not opposed to the development of Neom, but do not want to be evicted from their traditional homeland. Alya Abutayah Alhwaiti says she has received death threats from people she says are supporters of Mohammed bin Salman. She reported the threats to British police.

On 6 October 2020, The Independent reported that ancient Saudi Arabia's tribe Howeitat was in danger because of the $500bn (£385bn) hi-tech city project called Neom. In recent months the Saudi authorities allegedly arrested, harassed, hounded and even killed members of the tribe on being questioned for their plans and denied the sale of their land to the state. According to a London-based activist and spokesperson of the tribe, Alya Alhwaiti, and members of the tribe called the United Nations to investigate the matter. Alhwaiti claimed that the kingdom's crown prince Mohammed Bin Salman promised the tribe in 2016 to be a part of the Neom project along with a share in the development and improvement of the area. However, in 2020 the Howeitat tribe was instead forced to leave their land without a place to stay in exchange.

Language 
The Howeitat speak a variety of Bedouin Arabic, specifically Northwest Arabian Arabic.

In literature
The Howeitat are often mentioned in Richard Francis Burton's travelogue The Land of Midian, in which he gives the following account of their origin:

They are also mentioned in T. E. Lawrence's Seven Pillars of Wisdom and the film Lawrence of Arabia.

References

External links

Tribes of Arabia
Tribes of Saudi Arabia
Tribes of Jordan
Tribes of the State of Palestine
Bedouin groups